Beyond a Joke was a BBC comedy sketch show series broadcast in 1972 starring Eleanor Bron, John Bird and Barrie Ingham with writing contributions from Michael Frayn. Sketches from the series were shown in 2014 on The Comedy Vaults: BBC Two’s Hidden Treasure, part of BBC2's 50th birthday celebrations.

References

External links

1972 British television series debuts
1972 British television series endings
BBC television sketch shows
1970s British television sketch shows